Elasmostethus tristriatus (also called Juniper Shieldbug) is a species of bugs in Shield bug family. The species are green coloured with pinkish-red corium. They mate during spring. The larvae feed on berries, while adults feed on juniper. They also feed on Lawson's cypress.

Life cycle
The larvae appears from June–September after which, the nymphs emerge. The nymphs have 4 stages until adulthood.

References

Acanthosomatidae